Rinaldo Lopes Costa (born 31 July 1968), commonly known as Badico, is a Brazilian football manager and former player who played as a striker. He is the current manager of São Paulo-RS.

He was a top scorer of Campeonato Gaúcho in 1998 when he played for Esporte Clube Internacional.

External links
Badico profile at Globo Esporte's Futpedia

1968 births
People from Bagé
Living people
Brazilian footballers
Association football forwards
ABC Futebol Clube players
Grêmio Esportivo Brasil players
Guarani FC players
Sport Club Internacional players
Joinville Esporte Clube players
Millonarios F.C. players
São José Esporte Clube players
Villa Nova Atlético Clube players
Brazilian football managers
Clube Esportivo Bento Gonçalves managers
Sport Club São Paulo managers
Villa Nova Atlético Clube managers
Sportspeople from Rio Grande do Sul